Lu Xiaofeng is the fictional protagonist of the wuxia novel series Lu Xiaofeng Series by Gu Long. He has been portrayed in numerous films and television series adapted from the novel series by notable actors such as Damian Lau, Tony Liu, Alex Man, Nick Cheung, Jimmy Lin and Julian Cheung.

Character description 
Lu Xiaofeng is described as a charming, good-looking man with a moustache that resembles his eyebrows. Although he is known throughout the jianghu (martial artists' community) for being an alcoholic, flirt and regular patron of brothels, his unsavoury reputation is a disguise for his true personality. He is not only well-versed in martial arts, but also highly intelligent, witty and observant. These traits have helped him escape from danger and turn the tables on his enemies unexpectedly when he is apparently on the losing end. Besides, Lu Xiaofeng values friendship and often risks his life to help his friends when necessary.

Lu Xiaofeng is best known for his signature skill, the Lingxi Finger, which allows him to catch and hold items, including sharp blades, between his fingers. He does not favour any particular weapon and often relies only on his bare hands to fight enemies, even when he is outnumbered. His prowess in qinggong is also legendary.

Lu Xiaofeng's close friends include: Hua Manlou, a blind but highly observant martial artist who prefers to resolve problems without resorting to violence; Sikong Zhaixing, a qinggong expert who specialises in thieving and the art of disguise; Ximen Chuixue, a powerful swordsman who appears to be a cold-blooded and ruthless killer; and Zhu Ting, a master craftsman; Laoshi Heshang, an honest monk whom Lu Xiaofeng seeks advice from; Guisun Daye, a mysterious hermit who provides Lu Xiaofeng information in exchange for money.

Novels 

Lu Xiaofeng Chuanqi
A mysterious martial arts clan, Qingyilou, has recently emerged in the jianghu (martial artists' community) and has been causing much trouble. Out of curiosity, Lu Xiaofeng investigates and meets Princess Fengdan of the Great Golden Peng Kingdom in the Western Regions. The princess seeks his help on behalf of her father, the king, who is seeking vengeance on three traitors. The three traitors have changed their identities and are currently among the wealthiest and most powerful martial artists in the jianghu. Lu Xiaofeng is aware that he cannot complete the mission alone so he approaches Hua Manlou and Ximen Chuixue for help. After Lu Xiaofeng defeats the three traitors, the case is not over yet as Hua Manlou and Princess Fengdan have gone missing. Lu Xiaofeng also discovers that the king is actually an imposter. On the brink of imminent danger, Lu Xiaofeng manages to reverse the odds in an unexpected way and succeeds in solving the mystery.

Xiuhua Dadao
A mysterious bandit known as the "Embroidery Bandit" is suspected of having robbed a security company of a large sum of gold and having broken into a prince's residence. The authorities send the detective Jin Jiuling to investigate the case and arrest the bandit. Jin Jiuling seeks Lu Xiaofeng's help to solve the case within eight days. With help from his friends Sikong Zhaixing, Xue Bing and the "Serpent King", Lu Xiaofeng manages to lure the bandit into a trap and make him reveal his true identity: Jin Jiuling. Lu Xiaofeng defeats him and recovers the stolen items.

Juezhan Qianhou
Ximen Chuixue and Ye Gucheng, the two most powerful swordsmen in the jianghu, have arranged for a duel to the death at the rooftop of the Hall of Supreme Harmony in the imperial palace on the night of the Mid-Autumn Festival. As news of the event spread like wildfire throughout the jianghu, many martial artists gather in the capital to watch the duel and bet on the outcome. Before the duel, however, Ximen Chuixue disappears mysteriously and Ye Gucheng is wounded. At the same time, two of Lu Xiaofeng's acquaintances, Li Yanbei and Guisun Daye, are murdered, while Lu Xiaofeng's romantic interest, Ouyang Qing, is poisoned. Lu Xiaofeng has no clue to what is going on, and he suspects that the duel is meant to be a distraction for something. After investigating, Lu Xiaofeng discovers that Ye Gucheng is the mastermind behind a plot to assassinate the emperor and tries to stop him. The duel between the two swordsmen still proceeds as planned, and concludes with Ximen Chuixue defeating and slaying Ye Gucheng.

Yingou Dufang
The son of the Demonic Cult's leader has been murdered. Lanhuzi, the owner of the Silver Hook Gambling House, initially accuses Lu Xiaofeng of committing the murder. However, he promises to help Lu Xiaofeng prove his innocence if Lu Xiaofeng agrees to help him find the Demonic Cult's lost sacred artefact. Lu Xiaofeng finds the artefact but discovers that it is fake; the real one is actually with Lanhuzi. It turns out that Lanhuzi has been plotting to seize control of the cult's leadership and he has framed Lu Xiaofeng for the murder in order to divert the cult's attention away from himself. Lu Xiaofeng defeats Lanhuzi, exposes the plot, and returns the artefact to its rightful owner.

Youling Shanzhuang
Lu Xiaofeng had apparently molested Ximen Chuixue's wife and incurred the wrath of the swordsman, who has been trying to hunt him down and kill him. He takes shelter in the sinister Phantom Manor owned by Laodao Bazi, who is planning to eliminate four rivals and obtain a book containing some secrets of the jianghu. The book is hidden in the hat of the Wudang School's leader. Lu Xiaofeng foils Laodao Bazi's plan and exposes his true identity as an elder of the Wudang School plotting to seize the leadership position. It turns out that Lu Xiaofeng and Ximen Chuixue had caught wind of the plot earlier and had staged the incident to trick Laodao Bazi and allow Lu Xiaofeng to infiltrate the manor.

Fengwu Jiutian
A large amount of gold belonging to a prince has been robbed during its delivery and the 109 escorts have gone missing. Lu Xiaofeng is roaming the land freely when his help is much needed. He secretly follows two disguised martial artists on board a ship and ends up on an island, which is home to a group of powerful martial artists led by Gong Jiu. The missing escorts are held captive there. Lu Xiaofeng also meets a mysterious maiden, Sha Man, and falls in love with her. After Lu Xiaofeng escapes with Sha Man from the island, Gong Jiu spreads rumours in the jianghu and accuses Lu Xiaofeng of committing the robbery. Lu Xiaofeng enlists Ximen Chuixue's help to clear his name and eventually discover that Gong Jiu is the true mastermind behind the robbery. Lu Xiaofeng then confronts Gong Jiu and defeats him.

Jianshen Yixiao
Ximen Chuixue seeks Lu Xiaofeng's help in tracking down a swordsman, Liu Chengfeng. Lu Xiaofeng travels to a town near the desert, where he discovers Liu Chengfeng's dead body. He soon realises that the town is full of lurking dangers, and also traces clues from Liu Chengfeng's death to a former imperial consort, Gong Susu. After exploring the area, he locates a hidden treasure in the desert. The villains in the town have secretly followed him there and they attack him. Lu Xiaofeng is apparently stabbed and killed. Just then, Ximen Chuixue shows up and reveals that Lu Xiaofeng is still alive. They have set a trap for the villains, whom they defeat. At the end of the story, for the first time ever, the cold and unfeeling Ximen Chuixue bursts into laughter.

Adaptations

Films

Television

Others 
Luk Siu-fung is also the title of the theme song of Part 1 of the 1976 Hong Kong television series. It was composed by Joseph Koo, lyrics provided by Wong Jim, and sung by Adam Cheng in Cantonese.

References

External links 
  Full text of the novels

 
Gu Long characters
Novel series